Michel Theodoor de Meulemeester (21 May 1943 – 23 November 2000) was a Belgian rower. He competed at the 1964 Summer Olympics in the double sculls event, with Gérard Higny, and finished in ninth place.

References 

1943 births
2000 deaths
Belgian male rowers
Rowers at the 1964 Summer Olympics
Olympic rowers of Belgium
People from Brasschaat
Sportspeople from Antwerp Province